Filip Jović (born 6 August 1997) is a Serbian professional footballer who plays as a midfielder for Greek Super League 2 club Proodeftiki.

References

External links

1997 births
Living people
Sportspeople from Kruševac
Association football midfielders
Serbian footballers
Serbia youth international footballers
FK Partizan players
FK Teleoptik players
FK Napredak Kruševac players
FK Novi Pazar players
FK Radnik Surdulica players
FC Rukh Brest players
Proodeftiki F.C. players
Serbian expatriate footballers
Expatriate footballers in Belarus
Expatriate footballers in Greece